Logan Township is one of fourteen townships in Dearborn County, Indiana. As of the 2010 census, its population was 3,541 and it contained 1,290 housing units.

Logan Township took its name from Logan Creek.

Geography

Cities and towns
 Bright (northwest quarter)

Unincorporated towns
 Logan

Major highways
  Interstate 74
  Indiana State Road 46

Cemeteries
The township contains one cemetery, Logan.

References
 
 United States Census Bureau cartographic boundary files

External links

 Indiana Township Association
 United Township Association of Indiana

Townships in Dearborn County, Indiana
Townships in Indiana